Triumphis is a genus of sea snails, marine gastropod mollusks in the family Pseudolividae.

Species
Species within the genus Triumphis include:
 Triumphis distorta (Wood, 1828)
Species brought into synonymy
 Triumphis subrostrata (W. Wood, 1828): synonym of Nicema subrostrata (W. Wood, 1828)

References

 Vermeij G. (1998). Generic revision of the neogastropod family Pseudolividae. The Nautilus 111(2): 53-84

Pseudolividae